Alan James Scott (born 14 January 1934) was a career Colonial Civil Servant, whose last posting was as Governor of the Cayman Islands from 10 June 1987 to 14 September 1992.

Previously he had been Secretary for Transport in Hong Kong (1980–85) and later the Deputy Chief Secretary (1985-87) and before Hong Kong, he had served in Fiji until the country's independence in 1970.

He is married to Joan Hall Scott, born Joan Laureen Hall.

References

1934 births
Living people
British civil servants
Government officials of Hong Kong
Governors of the Cayman Islands